The 1978 Thunderbird Classic was a women's singles tennis tournament played on outdoor hard courts at the Arizona Biltmore Hotel in Phoenix, Arizona in the United States. The event was part of the AA category of the 1978 Colgate Series. It was the eighth edition of the tournament and was held from October 2 through October 8, 1978. First-seeded Martina Navratilova won the singles title and earned $14,000 first-prize money.

Winners

Singles

 Martina Navratilova defeated  Tracy Austin 6–4, 6–2
It was Navratilova's 11th title of the year and the 24th of her career.

Doubles

 Tracy Austin /  Betty Stöve defeated  Martina Navratilova /  Anne Smith 6–4, 6–7, 6–2

Prize money

Notes

References

External links
 International Tennis Federation (ITF) tournament details
  Women's Tennis Association (WTA) tournament details

Thunderbird Classic
Thunderbird Classic
Thunderbird Classic
Thunderbird Classic
Tennis tournaments in Arizona